Dolores "Dollie" Hernandez-Sison (October 2, 1919 - September 28, 2011) was a Filipina educator, philanthropist, and community leader in the province of Camarines Sur, Philippines. She also acted as a goodwill ambassador and diplomat during her years in the Batasang Pambasa (Interim National Legislature) (1978-1984) while she was designated as the Minister of Tourism. During her tenure as president of the University of Nueva Caceres, she held the distinction of being the third woman to become a university president in the Philippines.

Biography
Sison finished high school as valedictorian at the Philippine Women's University where she also graduated cum laude in both A.B. and B.S.E courses.  While at the PWU, she was president of the student council in high school and college and editor of the PhilWomenian and PWU annual. She was chosen as the Intercollegiate Girl of the college Editors Gild of the Philippines. She earned an M.A in Administration of Higher Education at Columbia University in New York City. On March 25, 1977 the PWU conferred upon her the degree of Doctor of Education, Honoris causa.

Her husband was the late Dean Antonio Moran Sison who won a delegate position to the Constitutional Convention in 1971. Sison was Philippine delegate to the 33rd and 34th UN General Assembly in 1978 and 1979 and to the world Tourism Organization Conferences: in India in 1983; Mexico, 1982; Italy, 1981; Manila, 1980; and Spain 1979. In Seoul, Korea she was guest speaker in June, 1982 at the Asian Women Parliamentarian Seminar.

For 20 years Sison was member for the Board of Governors of the Philippine Red Cross. She was awarded the Gold Humanitarian Service Cross, the highest Red Cross Award for volunteer service excellence.

Deeply religious, she was a member of the Association of our Lady  of Penafrancia and Cristian Maturity Formation Seminar and adviser of the Mother Butler's Mission Guild in Camarines Sur.

Awards

 Doctor of Education, Honoris Causa (PWU)
 Salute to Women YMCA (1977)
 Mayoral distinguished Service Award (1977)
 Special Mayoral Award (1984)
 Gold Humanitarian Service Cross, highest award of the Philippine National Red Cross (1992)
 Aurora Aragon Quezon Medal for distinguished leadership in the cause of humanity.
 People's Republic of China Red Cross Medal for being the first Filipino to visit the Red Cross Headquarters in Beijing in 1996.
 CAPA Award as outstanding alumna of the PWU (1980)
 National Commission on the Role of Filipino Women: Outstanding Bicolana Award (1996)
 Presidential Citation of Recognition and Commendation.

External links
 Official website of the University of Nueva Caceres

Filipino educators
People from Camarines Sur
2011 deaths
1919 births
Philippine Women's University alumni